Shavaripa (Sanskrit: Śabara) was an Indian Buddhist teacher, one of the eighty-four Mahasiddhas, honored as being among the holders of the distant transmission of Mahamudra. He was a student of Nagarjuna and a teacher of Maitripa. He is one of the forefathers of the Kagyu lineage of Tibetan Buddhism. Shavaripa is loosely related to the goddess Parnashavari and Janguli by relationship of the Shavari tribe of north-east India.

References

External links 
 Shavaripa
 Shavaripa
84 Mahasiddhas

Books 
 Dowman, Keith, trans., Masters of Mahāmudrā: Songs and Histories of the Eighty-Four Buddhist Siddhas, Albany, NY: SUNY Press, 1985.
 English, Elizabeth, Vajrayoginī: Her Visualizations, Rituals and Forms, Boston: Wisdom, 2002.
 
 
 Linrothe, Rob, Holy Madness: Portraits of Tantric Siddhas, Chicago: Serindia Publications, 2006.
 Templeman, David, trans., The Seven Instruction Lineages by Jo-nang-Tārānātha, Dharamsala: Library of Tibetan Works and Archives, 1983.
 Золотая Гирлянда - ранние учителя Кагью в Индии и Тибете, Лама Джампа Тхайе, Альмазный путь, 48.

Mahasiddhas
Indian scholars of Buddhism
Buddhist yogis
Indian Buddhists